Valentin André Henri Rosier  (born 19 August 1996) is a French professional footballer who plays as a right back for Turkish club Beşiktaş.

Club career
Born in Montauban, Tarn-et-Garonne, of Guadeloupean and Italian descent, Rosier began his senior career with Rodez AF in the fourth tier in 2015, moving to Dijon FCO of Ligue 1 a year later, on a three-season contract.

Rosier made his professional debut on 31 January 2017, in the last 32 of the Coupe de France, playing the entirety of a 2–1 loss at Bordeaux. Hosting the same opponents on 30 April, he played his first top-flight game in a goalless draw.

On 27 June 2019, Rosier signed a three-year contract at Sporting CP of Portugal's Primeira Liga, for a fee of €7.5 million and the exchange of Mama Baldé to Dijon. He debuted on 15 September in a 1–1 draw away to Boavista FC. His first season was disrupted by foot injuries.

On 2 October 2020, Rosier joined Beşiktaş on loan for the 2020–21 season. On 30 July 2021, Beşiktaş announced that Rosier had joined the club on a permanent basis.

International career
Rosier earned seven caps for France at under-21 level, all in 2018. On his debut on 23 March, the side won 3–0 away to Kazakhstan in a European qualifier.

Honours
Beşiktaş
Süper Lig: 2020–21
Turkish Cup: 2020–21
Turkish Super Cup: 2021

References

External links

1996 births
Living people
Association football defenders
French footballers
People from Montauban
Sportspeople from Tarn-et-Garonne
France youth international footballers
France under-21 international footballers
French people of Guadeloupean descent
French people of Italian descent
Ligue 1 players
Championnat National 2 players
Primeira Liga players
Montauban FCTG players
Rodez AF players
Dijon FCO players
Sporting CP footballers
Beşiktaş J.K. footballers
Süper Lig players
French expatriate footballers
French expatriate sportspeople in Portugal
Expatriate footballers in Portugal
French expatriate sportspeople in Turkey
Expatriate footballers in Turkey
Footballers from Occitania (administrative region)